The 1992–93 New Mexico Lobos men's basketball team represented the University of New Mexico as a member of the Western Athletic Conference. The Lobos were coached by head coach Dave Bliss and played their home games at the University Arena, also known as "The Pit", in Albuquerque, New Mexico.

Roster

Schedule and results

|-
!colspan=9 style=| Regular season

|-
!colspan=9 style=| WAC tournament

|-
!colspan=9 style=| NCAA tournament

Rankings

References

New Mexico Lobos men's basketball seasons
New Mexico
New Mexico
Lobos
Lobos